Rear Admiral(ret) Robert William Higgs  (7 July 1957, King Williams Town) is a former-South African Navy officer, who served as Chief of Naval Staff from 1 November 2010 to 31 August 2016.

Military career
After matriculating from Grey High School in Port Elizabeth, he joined the Navy in 1976 as a midshipman, graduating from the South African Naval College in 1978 before attending the South African Military Academy, obtaining a BMil (BSc). He qualified as a mine clearance officer before commanding 

In 1994 he became the first SA Navy officer to attend the US Naval War College. He then obtained a master's degree in International Relations from Salve Regina University in May 1996.

In 1996 he was promoted to captain, serving as the Director of Naval Force Planning and Director of Naval Strategy. In 1998 he was appointed the Naval attache to Washington.

In 2001 he was appointed as SSO Naval Career Management, followed by SSO Navy Public Relations.

In February 2005 he was promoted to rear admiral (jg) and appointed as Director of Maritime Warfare. He was appointed Chief of Fleet Staff in April 2007 before being appointed Flag Officer Fleet in April 2008 and promoted to rear admiral. On 1 November 2010 he became Chief of Naval Staff.

Awards and decorations

References

People from Qonce
1957 births
Naval War College alumni
South African admirals
Living people
Submarine commanders
Foreign recipients of the Legion of Merit